Hopton is a village and civil parish in the West Suffolk district of Suffolk in eastern England. Located just south of the Norfolk border on the B1111 road between Stanton and Garboldisham, in 2005 it had a population of 650. It shares a parish council with neighbouring Knettishall.

All Saints' Church is at the geographical centre of the village, it has regular services and is part of the United Benefice of Stanton, Hopton, Market Weston, Barningham & Coney Weston.

Schools
There is a primary school, and a pre-school. The primary school feeds students both to Thurston Community College in Thurston and Ixworth Free School in Ixworth.

References

External links

Hopton cum Knettishall Parish Council
Hopton Primary School

Villages in Suffolk
Civil parishes in Suffolk
Borough of St Edmundsbury